Llanfechell (from Welsh:  church + Saint Mechell) is a village in Anglesey, Wales. It is the largest of several small villages and dispersed settlements that make up Mechell Community Council area.

Mechell Community (which also includes the small villages of Mynydd Mechell and Carreglefn) had a 2001 population of 1,532, decreasing to 1,293 in 2011. Village services include a church, a primary school, a pub and two chapels. It is an agricultural area, and has been a local centre for markets, livestock fairs, and had both a watermill and a windmill. The area round about has many prehistoric monuments.

History
The many prehistoric remains close to the village indicate that the area has been lived in for thousands of years. The first written mention of Llanfechell itself is in 1291. The name Llanfechell means Church of St Mechell (In the lenitive (treiglad meddal) the 'M' becomes 'F', pronounced V.). Mechell (or Mechyll) appears to have been a 6th-century missionary, possibly from Brittany, who founded a monastery here. Hw is said to have been the son of Echwydd and the grandson of Gwyn Gohoyw, who flourished in the 5th century. A 17th century manuscript (Llanstephan MS. 125) records a Welsh poem, Cywydd i Fechell Sant. This describes how St Mechell was offered a gift of land in gratitude for a miraculous healing, to be demarcated by the route of a released hare. The hare, under divine guidance, marked the full extent of what is now the parish of Llanfechell, where he then founded the monastery.

18th century life in Llanfechell was described in great detail by William Bulkeley (1691–1760). From  1734 to 1760 he kept a daily diary recording Anglesey life, social customs, personal and family dealings, farming practices and the weather. William Bulkeley lived at Brynddu as Squire of Llanfechell. His daughter married Fortunatus Wright, a brewer from Liverpool whose colourful life included periods as a privateer.

Llanfechell was one of a network of market towns on Anglesey. During the 18th century and following, in addition to its weekly market day the village held a fair several times a year, for the sale of livestock and produce. The Llanfechell Fair no longer includes livestock and agricultural sales, but continues as a horticultural show and family fun day at Llanfechell Community School in late July.

A war memorial in the village square records those from the village who died in both world wars, three sons of Brigadier-General Owen Thomas of Brynddu, who headed Lloyd George's Welsh Army.

Community activities
'Menter Mechell' is an umbrella community venture, which helps facilitate a variety of activities and interest groups in the village. Areas of activity include the History Group, a Hobbies Group, the Maes Martin playground and sports project and an Allotment Group.

Church and chapels

St Mechell's Church includes features that date back to the 12th century. It is a Grade II* listed building in the centre of the village (location:). St Mechell's Day is 15 November. The thick stone walls are whitewashed externally, while the stone tower has a single bell, and is topped by an unusual cupola. The church is part of the Anglican Church in Wales, in the diocese of Bangor, and holds bilingual services at 10.00am each Sunday.

Facing the church across the village square is Libanus Chapel (Welsh Calvinistic Methodist). Founded in 1832, it was rebuilt in 1903. Ebenezer Chapel, a Welsh Independent chapel, is near the school on Mountain Road. Built in 1862, it replaced a chapel built soon after 1800. Both chapels are listed grade II.

Buildings
In addition to the three churches, there are six other listed buildings within the village (all grade II): 
(Location: . There was a medieval building which the diarist William Bulkeley began to rebuild in the 1690s. Brynddu estate has been in the hands of the Bulkeley family and their descendants for 500 years. It is now a 900-acre farming estate with five long-term tenant farmers in the locality, as well as 70 acres farmed directly from Brynddu. Since 2006 it has been the home of Robin Grove-White, formerly director of CPRE and chair of Greenpeace UK.
Crown Terrace, including Crown House. A row of three listed terraced buildings on the corner of the Square.
The Old Rectory, a 17th-century rectory, with 18th century additions, in grounds alongside the churchyard and Crown Terrace.
Llanfechell War Memorial, which incorporates a clock, and stands in the village square.

Ancient sites
There are four scheduled monuments close to the village:

Baron Hill Maen Hir

The standing stone 440 yards north of Llanfechell Church, known as Baron Hill Maen Hir, is a prehistoric standing stone (one of many such on Anglesey). In 2009 it had keeled over, and in 2010 it was lifted and re-set in position by Gwynedd Archaeological Trust under the guidance of Cadw. When removed from its socket, some 20 packing stones were found around its base, one of which had two 'pecked' engravings, a cupmark and a cup and ring mark. The engraved stone is now at Oriel Ynys Môn Museum, Llangefni. Such rock engravings are very rare in North Wales, and its use as part of the construction of the standing stone implies a particular, if unknown, significance.

Llanfechell Triangle

They are thought to date to the Bronze Age.

Pen-y-Morwydd Barrow
Pen-y-Morwydd Barrow, is a burial mound, probably from the Bronze Age, on the top of a hill between Llanfechell and Bodewryd. A footpath from Rhosbeirio crosses the mound. (Location:)

Llifad enclosure
It is a possible defended settlement a few hundred metres south of Pen-y-Morwydd Barrow, on the same hill, towards Carreglefn. Location: ,

Other archaeological sites
In addition to the scheduled sites, a range of other archaeological and historic sites are known:
Hilltop enclosure at Carog This has Neolithic settlement evidence with a circular defensive ditch dated to 800BC. Also 800-900AD house and domestic artifacts, excavated in 2010. Location: 
Burial chamber at Foel Fawr or Stones near Cromlech Farm (It may just be a 'suggestive natural feature'). Location: 
Mynydd Groes Earthwork a field enclosure, largely cleared. Location: 
Pen-y-Morwydd Pillow Mounda medieval constructed rabbit warren. Up to 7 are recorded at this site, most no longer visible. Location: 
Enclosure north-west of Llanfechell, roughly square, 16 yards across. Location: 
Tai Hen Cropmark Enclosure An irregular rectilinear enclosure some 50 yards across Location: 

Pont-y-Plas Bridge a road bridge with square headed arches and steps to the water. Location: 
Meddanen Water Mill and Melin Mechell Windmill (also known as Minffordd Mill and Melin Maen Arthur). Location:  (these two Medieval mills are close together so could have been worked by the same miller, depending on wind or water supply). The windmill fell out of use in the early 20th century and was converted into a house in the late 1970s.

Notable people 
 Saint Mechell, the 6th century founder and first abbot of the monastery of Llanfechell
 William Jones (1675–1749), a mathematician, said to have introduced the symbol for the mathematical constant π, attended school in the village.
 William Bulkeley (1691–1760) a minor Welsh landowner and meticulous diarist; born in Brynddu in the parish of Llanfechell

See also
Mechell, Anglesey
List of Scheduled Monuments in Anglesey

References

External links
Lanfechell village Website
Llanfechell School Website
Menter Mechell History Society 

Villages in Anglesey
Prehistoric sites in Anglesey
Mechell, Anglesey